FJA may refer to:
 Fiji Link, a Fijian airline
 Functional job analysis
 The Jean and Samuel Frankel Jewish Academy of Metropolitan Detroit
 Fédération des jeunes agriculteurs, a Belgian member of CEJA